Grado is the capital, and one of 28 parishes (administrative divisions) in the municipality of Grado, within the province and autonomous community of Asturias, in northern Spain. 

The population is 7,286 (INE 2007).

Villages and hamlets
 La Barraca de Abajo
 La Borbolla
 Grado
 Llavayos
 La Portiella

References

Parishes in Grado